Julianne Hough is the debut album studio by American country music singer, and professional dancer, Julianne Hough. The album was released on May 20, 2008 on Mercury Nashville Records.

After its release, the album debuted at #3 on the Billboard 200, selling about 67,000 copies during its first week.
The album was produced by David Malloy.
Hough's debut album also debuted at #1 on the Billboard Top Country Albums chart May 28, 2008.

The lead single off the album, "That Song in My Head", was released the week of March 3, 2008, and peaked at number 18 on that chart. "My Hallelujah Song" was released as the second single on September 22, peaking at number 44 and the music video was ranked number 48 on GAC's Top 50 Videos of the Year list.

Track listing

Chart positions

Weekly charts

Year-end charts

Singles – Billboard

Personnel

Musicians
 Spady Brannan — bass guitar
 Mike Brignardello — bass guitar
 Bob Britt — electric guitar
 Mickey Jack Cones — background vocals
 Eric Darken — percussion
 Glen Duncan — percussion
 Paul Franklin — steel guitar
 Tatiana Hanchero — background vocals
 Derek Hough — duet vocals on "Dreaming Under the Same Moon"
 Julianne Hough — lead vocals

 Mike Johnson — steel guitar
 Troy Lancaster — electric guitar
 B. James Lowry — acoustic guitar
 Jerry McPherson — electric guitar
 Jimmy Nichols — keyboards, Hammond B-3 organ,  piano, background vocals
 Karyn Rochelle — background vocals
 Jimmie Lee Sloas — bass guitar
 Ilya Toshinsky — acoustic guitar
 Lonnie Wilson — drums
 Jonathan Yudkin — fiddle, strings

Technical
 Adam Ayan — mastering
 Jake Bailey — makeup
 Ondrea Barbe — photography
 Tonya Ginnetti — production assistant
 Campbell McAuley — hair
 Karen Naff — art direction, design
 Chari Pirtle — production assistant
 Julie Weiss — wardrobe stylist

References

2008 debut albums
Julianne Hough albums
Mercury Nashville albums
Albums produced by David Malloy